is a Japanese film actor who has appeared in numerous movies, primarily in Hong Kong productions. He has occasionally been credited simply by his first name.

Sawada was born in Kanagawa. His first appearance was in a Japanese film Hey Oilers: The Legend of Skyline. Sawada's only other Japanese productions include Buyûden and Hasami as well as the 1998 Hong Kong-Japanese production B gai waak. Instead, Sawada has appeared more prominently in numerous Hong Kong productions, beginning with a minor role in the 1995 Jackie Chan film Thunderbolt. He also appeared in the 2009 Jackie Chan film Shinjuku Incident.

He played Captain Sawada in the Stephen de Souza-directed Street Fighter film, based on the fighting game series by the same name. Sawada appeared as part of a promotional deal with Capcom. Like most of the cast he also did the screen-capture for the video-game rendition based on the movie, Street Fighter: The Movie. Sawada has also been involved in the Street Fighter II: The Animated Movie as a script coordinator and has a writing credit for the Street Fighter II V anime series.

Filmography
 1990 Jipangu as Tobatsu
 1991 Hey Oilers: The Legend of Skyline as Hanayama
 1994 Street Fighter as Captain Sawada
 1995 Thunderbolt as "Saw"
 1996 Somebody Up There Likes Me as Yamada Motokazu
 1998 B gai waak as Detective Takami
 2000 Devils on the Doorstep (Guizi lai lee) as Inokichi Sakatsuka
 2001 Ye long as Ryuya Tanaka
 2003 Buyûden
 2009 Shinjuku Incident (San suk si gin) as Nakajima
 2010 Yip Man chin chyun as Kitano Yukio
 2011 Dai mo seut si as Mitearai
 2012 Hasami as Ken'ya
 2018 Xie bu ya zheng as Nemoto Ichiro
 2018 Huang Fei Hong: Nu hai xiong feng as Hattori Ichiro

References

External links
 Kenya Sawada official site
 
 澤田謙也チャンネル - official Youtube channel
 
 澤田謙也 - Hong Kong Movie Database

1965 births
Living people
Japanese male film actors
Male actors from Kanagawa Prefecture
20th-century Japanese male actors
21st-century Japanese male actors